Central Lancashire is an area of Lancashire, England.

Central Lancashire New Town
Central Lancashire New Town was the largest of the post-war English new towns, designated in 1970 and covering : the County Borough of Preston, parts of Chorley, Fulwood, Leyland, Walton-le-Dale, Chorley Rural District and Preston Rural District.

Its Development Corporation, abolished in 1986, pioneered shared ownership housing (as introduced by the Housing Act 1980) and also witnessed the first transfer of social housing stock to registered Housing Associations following tenant consultation and ballots.

Central Lancashire planning area
Since 2008, Central Lancashire is an area of joint spatial planning covering the Lancashire districts of the City of Preston, the Borough of South Ribble and the Borough of Chorley, referring to the area covered by the three districts. A joint Local Development Framework was adopted in 2012.

The officially estimated population in 2009 was 347,600.

Preston Built-up Area

The Office for National Statistics gives the 2011 population of the Preston Built-up Area, covering Preston, Leyland, Chorley, Bamber Bridge, Fulwood, Hutton, Longton, Adlington, Grimsargh and Euxton, as 313,322. This area replaced the 2001 definition of Preston Urban Area which then had a population of 264,601.

See also
Sir Francis Pearson, former MP for Clitheroe, was Chairman of the Central Lancashire New Town Development Corporation from 1971.
South Lancashire

References

External links
Central Lancashire New Town
Central Lancashire website

New towns in England
Geography of Lancashire
City of Preston, Lancashire
Borough of Chorley
South Ribble
New towns started in the 1980s
Urban areas of England